The Borakalalo Game Reserve is a protected area in North West Province, South Africa. It is located about 80 kilometres NNW of Pretoria and 60 km north of Brits. This majestic Nature reserve has unfortunately been hampered by numerous safety problems, especially affecting overnight visitors to the reserve. Also known as a fantastic birding destination with specials including African Finfoot, Meyer's Parrot and Grey-Headed Kingfisher.

Characteristics
The reserve covers an area of about 13,000 hectares. The protected area is situated around the Klipvoor Dam and the Moretele River. The park consists of woodland and open bushveld vegetation.

The nearest bank is at Letlhabile, about 45 km south of the Reserve. There is a shop at the gate of the park selling basic goods. There are also good fishing spots in the park area, mainly in the Klipvoor Dam.

Mammals

A large number of mammal species are present in the reserve, among others the following deserve mention:
Aardwolf
Black-backed jackal
Blesbok
Blue wildebeest
Brown hyena
Cape Buffalo
Cape fox
Caracal
Common Reedbuck
Eland
Gemsbok
Giraffe
Impala
Hippopotamus
Kudu
Leopard
Mountain reedbuck
Nyala
Red hartebeest
Roan antelope
Sable antelope
Tsessebe
Warthog
Waterbuck
Zebra

In addition to the mammals, over 350 species of bird have been recorded in the park. These include eagles and other birds of prey.

References

External links
Borakalalo Accommodation

North West Provincial Parks